The former First Church of Christ, Scientist, built in 1922,  is  an historic Classical Revival style Christian Science church located at 15422 Detroit Avenue, on the northeast corner of Detroit and Arthur avenues, across from the Public Library in Lakewood, Ohio. Its massive entrance portico is supported by six Doric columns. It was designed by noted Chicago-based  architect Charles Draper Faulkner, who was renowned for the churches and other buildings that he  designed in the United States and Japan. He designed over 33 Christian Science church buildings and wrote a book called  Christian Science Church Edifices which features this church as well as many others.

In 2005, the building was bought by 15422 LTD, which has renovated it for commercial use. The building is the headquarters of the Maxxum Group. First Church of Christ, Scientist, Lakewood is no longer in existence.

See also
List of former Christian Science churches, societies and buildings
 First Church of Christ, Scientist (disambiguation)

References

External links
Cleveland Memories - picture 1922
 Encyclopedia of Cleveland History
 Letter to City of Lakewood in opposition to historical designation for this building

Churches completed in 1922
20th-century Christian Science church buildings
Former Christian Science churches, societies and buildings in Ohio
Lakewood, Ohio
Churches in Cuyahoga County, Ohio
Charles Draper Faulkner church buildings
1922 establishments in Ohio